The neologism pre-tirement describes the emergence of a new working state, positioned between the traditional states of employment and retirement. The word is a portmanteau word, coming from the prefix "pre" and the word "retirement."  The state is being found primarily in first world economies, with aging populations. A "pre-tiree" will continue to create economic wealth and/or contribute to the generation of knowledge, likely on a part-time or reduced hours basis. Some "pre-tirees" use the period to give back by providing unpaid social support. This form of unpaid work creates economic benefit, by allowing taxes to be focused on other wealth creating or protecting activities, but relies on the existence of sufficient financial resource.

Usage 
 Used in a book title by Kris Miller (2012), though her usage describes planning for retirement, rather than an emerging state of employment.
 The ACAS website referred the important shift in retirement norms observed in the Zopa Report: "many people are choosing to ease into retirement in a 'phased or gradual process'.
 Use  of the neologism in news publications peaked after the publication of the Zopa Report.

References 

Termination of employment
Neologisms
Retirement